The Silver Medallion is an award given by the Telluride Film Festival in recognition of achievements in the film industry.

History of the Silver Medallion
The first Silver Medallions were awarded in 1974 at the 1st Telluride Film Festival. They are made of pure silver and the design has never changed, featuring the emblematic "SHOW" logo on their face. The presentation of the medallion is preceded by a clip reel, full feature and/or on stage interview. Traditionally, three Silver Medallions are given out each year, with a few exceptions where numerous people from a specific category were paid the honor. Since 1995, a fourth Silver Medallions has been awarded to a hero of cinema, a filmmaker, historian, critic, or organization dedicated to the celebration and preservation of film as an art.

Honorees
 1974 – Gloria Swanson, Francis Ford Coppola, Leni Riefenstahl
 1975 – Henry King, Werner Herzog, Jack Nicholson
 1976 – Chuck Jones, King Kong, King Vidor
 1977 – Michael Powell, Agnès Varda, Benjamin Carré
 1978 – Hal Roach, Sterling Hayden, Czechoslovak New Wave (Jaromil Jireš, Pavel Juráček, Jan Němec, and Ivan Passer)
 1979 – Abel Gance, Robert Wise, Klaus Kinski
 1980 – Robert Altman, Maurice Pialat, Karl Struss
 1981 – The Character Actor (John Carradine, Elisha Cook Jr., Margaret Hamilton, and Woody Strode), Carlos Diegues, Dušan Makavejev
 1982 – Joel McCrea, Pierre Braunberger, Athol Fugard
 1983 – Luis Trenker, Andrei Tarkovsky, Richard Widmark
 1984 – Henry Hathaway, Andrzej Wajda, Janet Leigh
 1985 – Emilio Fernández, Hanna Schygulla, Alexandre Trauner
 1986 – Alexander Mackendrick, Jiří Menzel, Isabelle Huppert
 1987 – Don Siegel, Stephen Frears, Tengiz Abuladze
 1988 – Pedro Almodóvar, Cab Calloway, Xi'an Film Studio
 1989 – Peter Greenaway, Dennis Potter, Shohei Imamura
 1990 – Gérard Depardieu, John Berry, Clint Eastwood
 1991 – Nature's Filmmakers (Peter Jones, Marion Zunz, and Paul Atkins), Jodie Foster, Sven Nykvist
 1992 – Elmer Bernstein, Cy Endfield, Harvey Keitel
 1993 – Ken Loach, John Alton, Jennifer Jason Leigh
 1994 – Judy Davis, Ken Burns, Harriet Andersson
 1995 – John Schlesinger, Zhang Yimou, The Surrealists (Jan Švankmajer, Guy Maddin, and Brothers Quay), Andrew Sarris
 1996 – Shirley MacLaine, Mike Leigh, Alain Cavalier, Roger Mayer
 1997 – Horton Foote, Neil Jordan, Alexander Sokurov, Facets Multi-Media (Milos Stehlik)
 1998 – Meryl Streep, Vittorio Storaro, Susumu Hani, Stanley Kauffmann
 1999 – Catherine Deneuve, David Lynch, Philip Glass, Arena
 2000 – Ang Lee, Stellan Skarsgård, Im Kwon-taek, Serge Silberman
 2001 – Catherine Breillat, Om Puri, Ken Russell, HBO
 2002 – Peter O'Toole, Paul Schrader, D. A. Pennebaker, Positif
 2003 – Peter Brook, Toni Collette, Krzysztof Zanussi, Ted Turner
 2004 – Laura Linney, Jean-Claude Carrière, Theodoros Angelopoulos, Fred Roos
 2005 – Mickey Rooney, The Dardennes brothers, Charlotte Rampling, The Criterion Collection, Janus Films
 2006 – Walter Murch, Penélope Cruz, Rolf de Heer, David Thomson
 2007 – Daniel Day-Lewis, Michel Legrand, Shyam Benegal, Leonard Maltin
 2008 – David Fincher, Jean Simmons, Jan Troell
 2009 – Anouk Aimée, Viggo Mortensen, Margarethe von Trotta, Serge Bromberg
 2010 – Claudia Cardinale, Colin Firth, Peter Weir, UCLA Film and Television Archive
 2011 – George Clooney, Pierre Étaix, Tilda Swinton. Special Medallion: Sight & Sound
 2012 – Roger Corman, Marion Cotillard, Mads Mikkelsen. Special Medallion: C. Chapin Cutler Jr., Boston Light & Sound
 2013 – Robert Redford, The Coen brothers, Mohammad Rasoulof, T Bone Burnett
 2014 – Volker Schlöndorff, Hilary Swank
 2015 – Danny Boyle, Adam Curtis, Rooney Mara
 2016 – Casey Affleck, Amy Adams, Pablo Larraín
 2017 – Christian Bale, Edward Lachman
 2018 – Alfonso Cuarón, Emma Stone, Rithy Panh
 2019 – Adam Driver, Renée Zellweger, Philip Kaufman
 2020 – Chloé Zhao, Anthony Hopkins, Kate Winslet (cancelled)
 2021 – Riz Ahmed, Jane Campion, Peter Dinklage
 2022 – Sarah Polley, Cate Blanchett, Mark Cousins

References 

Silver Medallion
American film awards
Telluride, Colorado